Club Olimpia Itá is a Paraguayan football club. In 2015, the club gained promotion from the Paraguayan Primera División B to the División Intermedia for the 2016 season.

Notable players
To appear in this section a player must have either:
 Played at least 125 games for the club.
 Set a club record or won an individual award while at the club.
 Been part of a national team at any time.
 Played in the first division of any other football association (outside of Paraguay).
 Played in a continental and/or intercontinental competition.

Non-CONMEBOL players
 Karim Safsaf (2016)

References

Football clubs in Paraguay
Football in Paraguay